Spilogona is a very large genus of flies from the family Muscidae.

Species

Spilogona acrostichalis (Stein, 1916)
Spilogona acuticornis (Malloch, 1920
Spilogona aenea Huckett, 1965
Spilogona aerea (Fallén, 1825)
Spilogona aestuarium Huckett, 1965
Spilogona alberta (Huckett, 1932)
Spilogona albifrons Malloch, 1931
Spilogona albinepennis Huckett, 1965
Spilogona albisquama (Ringdahl, 1932)
Spilogona almqvistii (Holmgren, 1880)
Spilogona alpica (Zetterstedt, 1845)
Spilogona anthrax (Bigot, 1885)
Spilogona arcticola Huckett, 1965
Spilogona arenosa (Ringdahl, 1918)
Spilogona argenticeps Malloch, 1924
Spilogona argentifrons Malloch, 1931
Spilogona argentiventris (Malloch, 1920)
Spilogona atricans (Pandellé, 1899)
Spilogona atrisquamula Hennig, 1959
Spilogona aucklandica (Hutton, 1902)
Spilogona aureifaces Malloch, 1931
Spilogona austriaca (Ringdahl, 1948)
Spilogona badia (Hutton, 1901)
Spilogona baltica (Ringdahl, 1918)
Spilogona barrowensis Huckett, 1965
Spilogona bathurstiana Huckett, 1965
Spilogona bifimbriata Huckett, 1965
Spilogona biseriata (Stein, 1916)
Spilogona bisetosa (Huckett, 1932)
Spilogona brevicornis (Malloch, 1917)
Spilogona broweri Huckett, 1973
Spilogona brunneifrons Ringdahl, 1931
Spilogona brunneinota (Harrison, 1955)
Spilogona brunneisquama (Zetterstedt, 1845)
Spilogona brunneivittata (Harrison, 1955)
Spilogona calcaria Huckett, 1965
Spilogona caliginosa (Stein, 1916)
Spilogona cana (Huckett, 1932)
Spilogona carbonaria (Hutton, 1901)
Spilogona carbonella (Zetterstedt, 1845)
Spilogona caroli (Malloch, 1920)
Spilogona churchillensis Huckett, 1965
Spilogona clarans (Huckett, 1932)
Spilogona coachilis (Huckett, 1965)
Spilogona comata (Huckett, 1932)
Spilogona compacta Huckett, 1965
Spilogona concolor (Stein, 1920)
Spilogona concomitans Huckett, 1973
Spilogona confluens Huckett, 1965
Spilogona consortis Huckett, 1965
Spilogona contigua Huckett, 1965
Spilogona contractifrons (Zetterstedt, 1838)
Spilogona crepusculenta (Huckett, 1932)
Spilogona cretans (Huckett, 1932)
Spilogona curvipes (Lamb, 1909)
Spilogona dasyops (Stein, 1910)
Spilogona deflorata (Holmgren, 1872)
Spilogona denigrata (Meigen, 1826)
Spilogona denudata (Holmgren, 1869)
Spilogona depressiuscula (Zetterstedt, 1838)
Spilogona depressula (Zetterstedt, 1845)
Spilogona dispar (Fallén, 1823)
Spilogona disparata Huckett, 1967
Spilogona dolosa (Hutton, 1901)
Spilogona dorsata (Zetterstedt, 1845)
Spilogona dorsostriata Huckett, 1965
Spilogona empeliogaster Huckett, 1965
Spilogona enallos Huckett, 1965
Spilogona extensa (Malloch, 1920)
Spilogona falleni Pont, 1984
Spilogona fatima (Huckett, 1932)
Spilogona ferrari (Pont, 1973)
Spilogona fimbriata (Schnabl, 1915)
Spilogona firmidisetosa Huckett, 1965
Spilogona flavinervis Huckett, 1965
Spilogona flaviventris Malloch, 1931
Spilogona forticula Huckett, 1965
Spilogona frontulenta Huckett, 1965
Spilogona fuliginosa (Hutton, 1901)
Spilogona fulvescens (Hutton, 1901)
Spilogona fulvibasis Huckett, 1965
Spilogona fumicosta Malloch, 1931
Spilogona genualis Huckett, 1965
Spilogona gibsoni (Malloch, 1920)
Spilogona griseola (Collin, 1930)
Spilogona hudsoni Malloch, 1925
Spilogona humeralis Huckett, 1965
Spilogona hurdiana Huckett, 1965
Spilogona hypopygialis Huckett, 1965
Spilogona insularis (Lamb, 1909)
Spilogona imitatrix (Malloch, 1921)
Spilogona incauta (Huckett, 1932)
Spilogona incerta Huckett, 1965
Spilogona infuscata Huckett, 1965
Spilogona instans (Huckett, 1932)
Spilogona karelica (Tiensuu, 1936)
Spilogona katahdin Huckett, 1973
Spilogona krogerusi (Ringdahl, 1941)
Spilogona kuntzei (Schnabl, 1911)
Spilogona lapponica (Ringdahl, 1932)
Spilogona lasiophthalma (Lamb, 1909)
Spilogona latilamina (Collin, 1930)
Spilogona latimana Malloch, 1931
Spilogona leucogaster (Zetterstedt, 1838)
Spilogona limnophorina (Stein, 1898)
Spilogona limpida (Hutton, 1901)
Spilogona litorea (Fallén, 1823)
Spilogona maculipennis (Hutton, 1901)
Spilogona magnipunctata (Malloch, 1919)
Spilogona malaisei (Ringdahl, 1920)
Spilogona marginifera Hennig, 1959
Spilogona marina (Collin, 1921)
Spilogona meadei (Schnabl, 1915)
Spilogona medialis Huckett, 1965
Spilogona megastoma (Boheman, 1866)
Spilogona melanosoma (Huckett, 1932)
Spilogona melas (Schiner, 1868)
Spilogona micans (Ringdahl, 1918)
Spilogona minuta (Harrison, 1955)
Spilogona minycalyptrata Huckett, 1965
Spilogona monacantha (Collin, 1930)
Spilogona murina Huckett, 1965
Spilogona mydaeinaformis Huckett, 1965
Spilogona narina (Walker, 1849)
Spilogona neglecta Huckett, 1965
Spilogona nigerrima Huckett, 1965
Spilogona nigrifemur Malloch, 1925
Spilogona nigriventris (Zetterstedt, 1845)
Spilogona nitidicauda (Schnabl, 1911)
Spilogona nobilis (Stein, 1898)
Spilogona nordenskioldi (Holmgren, 1883)
Spilogona norvegica (Ringdahl, 1932)
Spilogona novemmaculata (Zetterstedt, 1860)
Spilogona nutara Huckett, 1965
Spilogona obscura (Malloch, 1919)
Spilogona obscuripennis (Stein, 1916)
Spilogona obsoleta (Malloch, 1920)
Spilogona ocularia (Villeneuve, 1922)
Spilogona opaca (Schnabl, 1915)
Spilogona ordinata (Hutton, 1901)
Spilogona pacifica (Meigen, 1826)
Spilogona padlei Huckett, 1965
Spilogona palmeni (Ringdahl, 1935)
Spilogona parvimaculata (Stein, 1920)
Spilogona pennata Malloch, 1925
Spilogona perambulata Huckett, 1965
Spilogona placida (Huckett, 1932)
Spilogona princeps Huckett, 1965
Spilogona projecta Huckett, 1965
Spilogona pruinella (Huckett, 1932)
Spilogona pseudodispar (Frey, 1915)
Spilogona puberula (Ringdahl, 1918)
Spilogona pulchra (Huckett, 1932)
Spilogona pulvicrura (Huckett, 1932)
Spilogona pusilla (Huckett, 1932)
Spilogona pygmaea Ringdahl, 1951
Spilogona quinquelineata (Zetterstedt, 1838)
Spilogona rapax (Hutton, 1901)
Spilogona reflecta (Huckett, 1932)
Spilogona robusta Huckett, 1965
Spilogona rostrata (Ringdahl, 1932)
Spilogona rufa (Hutton, 1902)
Spilogona rufitarsis (Stein, 1920)
Spilogona salmita Huckett, 1965
Spilogona sanctipauli (Malloch, 1921)
Spilogona scutulata (Schnabl, 1911)
Spilogona sectata (Huckett, 1932)
Spilogona semiglobosa (Ringdahl, 1916)
Spilogona separata Huckett, 1965
Spilogona septemnotata (Zetterstedt, 1845)
Spilogona septentrionalis (Ringdahl, 1918)
Spilogona seticaudalis Huckett, 1965
Spilogona setigera (Stein, 1907)
Spilogona setilamellata (Huckett, 1932)
Spilogona setinervis (Huckett, 1932)
Spilogona setipes Huckett, 1965
Spilogona setulosa (Ringdahl, 1941)
Spilogona sjostedti (Ringdahl, 1926)
Spilogona solitariana (Collin, 1921)
Spilogona sorenseni (Harrison, 1955)
Spilogona sordidipennis (Holmgren, 1883)
Spilogona sororcula (Zetterstedt, 1845)
Spilogona sospita (Huckett, 1932)
Spilogona spectabilis (Tiensuu, 1938)
Spilogona spinicostalis Huckett, 1965
Spilogona spininervis (Villeneuve, 1922)
Spilogona subnotata Huckett, 1965
Spilogona surda (Zetterstedt, 1845)
Spilogona suspecta (Malloch, 1920)
Spilogona tendipes (Malloch, 1920)
Spilogona tenuicornis Malloch, 1923
Spilogona tenuis Hennig, 1959
Spilogona tetrachaeta (Malloch, 1920)
Spilogona tornensis (Ringdahl, 1926)
Spilogona torreyae (Johannsen, 1916)
Spilogona triangulifera (Zetterstedt, 1838)
Spilogona trianguligera (Zetterstedt, 1838)
Spilogona trigonata (Zetterstedt, 1838)
Spilogona trigonifera (Zetterstedt, 1838)
Spilogona trilineata (Huckett, 1932)
Spilogona tundrae (Schnabl, 1915)
Spilogona tundrarum Huckett, 1965
Spilogona tundrica (Schnabl, 1911)
Spilogona turbidipennis Huckett, 1965
Spilogona varsaviensis Schnabl, 1911
Spilogona veterrima (Zetterstedt, 1845)
Spilogona villosa (Hutton, 1902)

References

Muscidae
Brachycera genera